Mathias Gerhard "Tias" Eckhoff (25 June 1926 – 30 January 2016) was a Norwegian industrial designer. He was born in Vestre Slidre, a son of shipmaster Trygve Eckhoff and Sigrid Einang, and was a brother of Torstein Eckhoff. He worked as designer for Porsgrunds Porselænsfabrik from 1949. Among his designs are Det riflede  from 1952, Maya from 1961, and Una from 1973. He is represented in various museums, including the Museum of Modern Art in New York City, and the Victoria and Albert Museum in London. He was awarded the Lunning Prize in 1953. His designs won gold medals at the Triennale in Milan in 1954, 1957, and 1960.

References

1926 births
2016 deaths
People from Vestre Slidre
Norwegian industrial designers